The Valley Hospital is a 451-bed, acute-care, not-for-profit hospital in Ridgewood, Bergen County, New Jersey. Valley staff includes more than 1,100 physicians, 3,700 employees and 3,000 volunteers.

In 2020, Valley recorded 41,345 admissions, 51,792 emergency department visits and 3,528 births.

The Valley Hospital is part of Valley Health System, which also includes Valley Home Care and Valley Medical Group.

Healthcare services 
Services available at The Valley Hospital include:

 The Valley Heart and Vascular Institute
 The Bolger Emergency Department
 The Blumenthal Cancer Center
 The Total Joint Replacement Center
 The Valley Hospital Breast Center
 The Center for Childbirth (including a Neonatal Intensive Care Unit)
 Maternal-Fetal Medicine services
 Pediatrics (including a pediatric emergency room and developmental pediatrics)
 The Neuroscience Center of Excellence
 The Same-Day Services Center
 The Valley Fertility Center
 The Center For Minimally Invasive and Robotic Surgery
 The Center for Metabolic and Weight Loss Surgery
 The Center for Sleep Medicine 
 The Gamma Knife Center
 Mobile Intensive Care Unit (MICU)

Locations

Main Hospital Campus (223 North Van Dien Ave., Ridgewood) 
The Valley Hospital's main campus houses the hospital's inpatient medical/surgical services and emergency department, as well as cardiovascular, orthopedic, oncology, mother/baby and neurology services.

Luckow Pavilion (1 Valley Health Plaza, Paramus) 
The Robert and Audrey Luckow Pavilion is home to the George R. Jaqua Same Day Services Center, the Daniel and Gloria Blumenthal Cancer Center, the Valley Hospital Fertility Center and the Valley Health Pharmacy.

Kraft Center (15 Essex Road, Paramus) 
Support offices for The Valley Hospital, Valley Home Care and Valley Medical Group are located at The Dorothy B. Kraft Center.

Kireker Center for Child Development (140 E. Ridgewood Ave., Paramus) 
The Center for Child Development offers care for children with special needs, including developmental pediatrics, rehabilitation therapy, audiology services, feeding therapy, autism programs and more.

The New Valley Hospital 
Valley is currently building a state-of-the-art, 372-bed hospital on a brand-new campus in Paramus. The New Valley Hospital will provide single-patient rooms to enhance patient privacy, safety and comfort.  A flexible facility design, with features such as universally sized operating and procedure rooms, will enable the hospital to adapt to changing needs and medical technology. The hospital is expected to open in 2023.

Affiliations 
In December 2014, Valley announced its affiliation with the Mount Sinai Health System. The academic partnership brings new research opportunities to Valley, with the goal of enhancing the hospital's clinical services and attracting leading physicians. Both institutions will remain independent.

In April 2015, Valley announced its affiliation with Cleveland Clinic's Sydell and Arnold Miller Family Heart & Vascular Institute. Through this affiliation, Valley has become a member of the Cleveland Clinic Cardiovascular Specialty Network. Both institutions will share best practices in cardiac care, coordinate care, and develop programs to improve quality of care and patient safety.

Awards 
Valley is the recipient of numerous awards and distinctions, making it one of the most honored healthcare organizations in New Jersey. Recognitions include an "A" for patient safety from The Leapfrog Group; and a Top Performer on Key Quality Measures distinction from The Joint Commission, among others.

References

Hospitals in New Jersey
Hospitals in Bergen County, New Jersey